The 9th Infantry Division ("Old Reliables") is an inactive infantry division of the United States Army. It was created as the 9th Division during World War I, but never deployed overseas. In later years, it would become an important unit of the U.S. Army during World War II and the Vietnam War. It was also activated as a peacetime readiness unit from 1947 to 1962 at Fort Dix, New Jersey, and Fort Carson, Colorado, and from 1972 to 1991 as an active-duty infantry division at Fort Lewis, Washington. Nicknamed the "Old Reliables", the division was eventually deactivated in December 1991.

Insignia
The shoulder sleeve insignia is an octofoil resembling a heraldic design given to the ninth son of a family. This represents the son as a circle in the middle with eight brothers around him. The blue represents the infantry, the red the artillery with all the white making the colors of the flag of the United States of America.

World War I
The 9th Infantry Division was created on 18 July 1918 at Camp Sheridan, Alabama but did not serve overseas.

Its units included Division Headquarters; the 17th Infantry Brigade (Headquarters and Headquarters Company; 45th Infantry Regiment; 67th Infantry Regiment; 26th Machine Gun Battalion); the 18th Infantry Brigade (Headquarters and Headquarters Company; 46th Infantry Regiment; 68th Infantry Regiment; 27th Machine Gun Battalion), the 9th Field Artillery Brigade ( 25th Field Artillery (75mm Gun); 26th Field Artillery (75mm Gun); 27th Field Artillery (155mm Howitzer); Ninth Trench Mortar Battery); 25th Machine Gun Battalion; 209th Engineer Regiment; 209th Field Signal Battalion; Division Trains (HQ Train and Military Police Company; 9th Sanitary Train; 9th Motor Supply Train, and Ninth Ammunition Train).

The division was commanded by Colonel Charles C. Clark (July 1918 - September 1918), Maj. Gen. Willard A. Holbrook (September 1918 - October 1918), Brig. Gen. James E. Ryan (October 1918 - November 1918) acting, Maj. Gen. Willard A. Holbrook (November 1918 - February 1919)

Interwar period

The 9th Division was demobilized at Camp Sheridan, Alabama, on 15 February 1919. In 1921, because of funding cuts, the Army had decided to inactivate the 4th through 9th Divisions, except for one brigade and certain supporting elements of each division. When the 9th Division was reconstituted in the Regular Army on 24 March 1923, the 18th Infantry Brigade (5th and 13th Infantry Regiments) along with several other elements were assigned as active units; They formed the core from which the remainder of the division would be reactivated in the event of war. The division was allotted to the First Corps Area for mobilization responsibility, and assigned to the I Corps. Camp Devens, Massachusetts, was designated as the mobilization and training station for the division upon reactivation. The division's inactive units were assigned to "active associate" units for mobilization purposes. The division headquarters was organized on 28 July 1926 as a Regular Army Inactive unit with Organized Reserve personnel at the Army Base, Boston, Massachusetts, and by mid-1927, most of the inactive units of the division were also organized as such.

World War II 
Activated: 1 August 1940 at Fort Bragg, North Carolina.
Overseas: 11 December 1942 (Three organic combat teams participated in North African landings 8 November 1942)
Campaigns: Algeria-French Morocco, Tunisia, Sicily, Normandy, North France, Rhineland Campaign, Ardennes-Alsace, Central Europe
Days of combat: 304
Distinguished Unit Citations: 24
Awards: Medal of Honor – 4; Distinguished Service Cross – 76; Distinguished Service Medal – 3; Silver Star – 2,282; Legion of Merit – 19; DFC – 2; Soldier's Medal – 100; Bronze Star –6,593; Air Medal – 129
Commanders: Col . Charles B. Elliott (August 1940), Brig. Gen. Francis W. Honeycutt (September 1940), Maj. Gen. Jacob L. Devers (October 1940 – July 1941), Maj. Gen. Rene Edward De Russy Hoyle (August 1941 – July 1942), Maj. Gen. Manton S. Eddy (August 1942 – August 1944), Maj. Gen. Louis A. Craig (August 1944 – May 1945), Brig. Gen. Jesse A. Ladd (May 1945 – February 1946), Maj. Gen. Horace L. McBride (March 1946 to inactivation)
Inactivated: 15 January 1947
Reactivated: 15 July 1947 at Fort Dix, New Jersey
Inactivated: 31 January 1962 at Fort Carson, Colorado
Redesignated 1 February 1966 as Headquarters and Headquarters Company, 9th Infantry Division, and activated at Fort Riley, Kansas
Inactivated 25 September 1969 in Hawaii
Activated: 21 April 1972 at Fort Lewis, Washington
Inactivated: 15 December 1991 at Fort Lewis, Washington

Combat chronicle 
The 9th Infantry Division was among the first U.S. combat units to engage in offensive ground operations during World War II. (The others were the 32nd and the 41st in the Pacific on New Guinea, Carlson's Raiders on Makin Island, the 1st Marine, and the
Americal on Guadalcanal, and, alongside the 9th in North Africa, were the 1st Infantry, 3rd Infantry, 34th Infantry and the 2nd Armored Divisions.) The 9th saw its first combat on 8 November 1942, when its elements landed at Algiers, Safi, and Port Lyautey, with the taking of Safi by the 3rd Battalion of the 47th Infantry Regiment standing as the first liberation of a city from Axis control in World War II.

With the collapse of French resistance on 11 November 1942, the division patrolled the Spanish Moroccan border. The 9th returned to Tunisia in February and engaged in small defensive actions and patrol activity. On 28 March 1943 it launched an attack in southern Tunisia and fought its way north into Bizerte, 7 May. In August, the 9th landed at Palermo, Sicily, and took part in the capture of Randazzo and Messina.

Sent to England for further training, the division landed on Utah Beach on 10 June 1944 (D plus 4), cut off the Cotentin Peninsula, drove on to Cherbourg Harbour and penetrated the port's heavy defenses.

Following a brief rest in July, the division took part in the St. Lo break-through and in August helped close the Falaise Gap. Turning east, the 9th crossed the Marne, 28 August, swept through Saarlautern, and in November and December held defensive positions from Monschau to Losheim.

Moving north to Bergrath, Germany, it launched an attack toward the Roer, 10 December, taking Echtz and Schlich. From mid-December through January 1945, the division held defensive positions from Kalterherberg to Elsenborn. On 30 January the division jumped off from Monschau in a drive across the Roer and to the Rhine, crossing at Remagen, 7 March.

After breaking out of the Remagen bridgehead, the 9th assisted in the sealing and clearing of the Ruhr Pocket, then moved 150 miles (240 km) east to Nordhausen (where it assisted in the liberation of the local concentration camp) and attacked in the Harz Mountains, 14–20 April. On 21 April the Division relieved the 3d Armored Division along the Mulde River, near Dessau, and held that line until VE-day.

Assignments in Mediterranean Theater of Operations (MTO) 
previous: II Corps
May 1943: I Armored Corps

Assignments in European Theater of Operations (ETO) 
20 November 1943: First Army
25 November 1943: VII Corps
1 August 1944: VII Corps, First Army, 12th Army Group
26 October 1944: V Corps
6 December 1944: VII Corps
18 December 1944: V Corps
20 December 1944: Attached, with the entire First Army, to the British 21st Army Group
18 January 1945: V Corps, First Army, 12th Army Group
17 February 1945: III Corps
31 March 1945: VII Corps
4 April 1945: III Corps
14 April 1945: VII Corps

Order of battle 
 Headquarters, 9th Infantry Division
39th Infantry Regiment
47th Infantry Regiment
60th Infantry Regiment
 Headquarters and Headquarters Battery, 9th Infantry Division Artillery
26th Field Artillery Battalion (105 mm)
34th Field Artillery Battalion (155 mm)
60th Field Artillery Battalion (105 mm)
84th Field Artillery Battalion (105 mm)
 15th Engineer Combat Battalion
 9th Medical Battalion
 9th Cavalry Reconnaissance Troop (Mechanized)
 Headquarters, Special Troops, 9th Infantry Division
 Headquarters Company, 9th Infantry Division
 709th Ordnance Light Maintenance Company
 9th Quartermaster Company
 9th Signal Company
 Military Police Platoon
 Band
 9th Counterintelligence Corps Detachment
 376th Anti-Aircraft Artillery Battalion Detachment

Statistics

Chronology 
Activated 1 August 1940
Arrived UK 27 November 1943
Arrived Continent (D+4) 10 June 1944
Entered Combat 14 June 1944 (First elements in combat in North Africa 8 November 1942; entire division entered combat 26 March 1943)
Days in Combat 264

Casualties 
Total battle casualties: 23,277
Killed in action: 3,856
Wounded in action: 17,416
Missing in action: 357
Prisoner of war: 1,648

Campaigns 
 Algeria-French Morocco (Arrowhead device)
 Tunisia
 Sicily
 Normandy
 Northern France
 Rhineland
 Ardennes-Alsace
 Central Europe

Individual awards 
Medal of Honor: 4
Distinguished Service Cross: 86
Legion of Merit: 6
Silver Star: 1,789
Soldier's Medal: 55
Bronze Star: 5,518
Distinguished Flying Cross: 1
Air Medal: 124

Unit awards

  Presidential Unit Citation, Division Artillery Headquarters and Headquarters Battery, for 21–23 February 1943 (WD GO 115, 1946)
  Presidential Unit Citation, Military Police Platoon, for 9–15 March 1943 (WD GO 84, 1945)
  Presidential Unit Citation, Company B, 9th Medical Battalion, for 8–19 March 1945 (WD GO 65, 1946)
  Presidential Unit Citation, 15th Engineer Combat Battalion, for 14 September-23 October 1944 (WD GO 67, 1946)
  Presidential Unit Citation, Company B, 15th Engineer Combat Battalion, for 8–19 March 1945 (WD GO 65, 1946)
  Presidential Unit Citation, 34th Field Artillery Battalion, for 21–23 February 1943 (WD GO 51, 1946)
  Presidential Unit Citation, 1st Battalion, 39th Infantry Regiment, for 18 June 1944 (WD GO 10, 1945)
  Presidential Unit Citation, 2nd Battalion, 39th Infantry Regiment, for 11–12 July 1944 (WD GO 24, 1945)
  Presidential Unit Citation, 1st Battalion, 39th Infantry Regiment, for 6–9 August 1944 (WD GO 10, 1945)
  Presidential Unit Citation, 2nd Battalion, 47th Infantry Regiment, for 21–26 June 1944 (WD GO 86, 1944)
  Presidential Unit Citation, 1st Battalion, 47th Infantry Regiment
  Presidential Unit Citation, 47th Infantry Regiment, for 8–19 March 1945 (WD GO 65, 1946)
  Presidential Unit Citation, 2nd Battalion, 47th Infantry Regiment, for 2–5 April 1945 (WD GO 98, 1945)
  Presidential Unit Citation, 3rd Battalion, 47th Infantry Regiment, for 14–22 September 1944 (WD GO 139, 1946)
  Presidential Unit Citation, 3rd Battalion, 47th Infantry Regiment, for 24–28 November 1944 (DA GO 25, 1948)
  Presidential Unit Citation, 60th Field Artillery Battalion, for 21–23 February 1943 (WD GO 84, 1947)
  Presidential Unit Citation, 2nd Battalion, 60th Infantry Regiment, for 23–24 April 1943 (WD GO 1, 1944)
  Presidential Unit Citation, 2nd Battalion, 60th Infantry Regiment, for 16 June 1944 (WD GO 90, 1944)
  Presidential Unit Citation, Cannon Company, 60th Infantry Regiment, for 21–23 February 1943 (WD GO 84, 1947)
  Presidential Unit Citation, Medical Detachment, 3rd Battalion, 60th Infantry Regiment, for 6 September 1944 (WD GO 12, 1945)
  Presidential Unit Citation, Company B, 60th Infantry Regiment, for 12 December 1944 (WD GO 55, 1945)
  Presidential Unit Citation, 2nd Battalion, 60th Infantry Regiment, for 9–10 February 1945 (WD GO 68, 1945)
  Presidential Unit Citation, 60th Field Artillery Battalion, for 21–23 February 1943 (WD GO 84, 1947)
  Presidential Unit Citation, 84th Field Artillery Battalion (WD GO 51, 1946)
  Presidential Unit Citation, 84th Field Artillery Battalion (WD GO 65, 1946)

Prisoners of war taken 
Total: 130,000

Post World War II 
The 9th Infantry Division was reactivated on 15 July 1947 at Fort Dix, New Jersey and assumed a peacetime readiness and training role. In the 1950s, the division was stationed in West Germany. It later relocated to Fort Carson, Colorado where it was inactivated on 31 January 1962.

Commanding generals

 Maj. Gen. William W. Eagles (15 July 1947 – 26 April 1948)
 Maj. Gen. Arthur A. White (27 April 1948 – October 1949)
 Maj. Gen. John M. Devine (October 1949 - September 1950)
 Maj. Gen. William K. Harrison Jr. (September 1950 - February 1952)
 Maj. Gen. Roderick R. Allen (February 1952 - June 1952)
 Maj. Gen. Homer W. Kiefer (June 1952 - July 1953)
 Maj. Gen. Cornelius E. Ryan (July 1953 - May 1954)
 Maj. Gen. Donald P. Booth (May 1954 - November 1954)
 Maj. Gen. Halley G. Maddox (November 1954 - June 1956)
 Maj. Gen. Harry P. Storke (June 1956 - September 1957)
 Brig. Gen. Joseph B. Crawford (September 1957 - March 1958)
 Maj. Gen. Martin J. Morin (March 1958 - April 1959)
 Brig. Gen. Richard A. Risden (April 1959 - March 1960)
 Colonel Charles L. Heltman Jr. (March 1960 - May 1960) - acting
 Brig. Gen. Ashton H. Manhart (May 1960 - February 1962) - Division inactivated

Vietnam War 
The 9th Division was reactivated on 1 February 1966, and arrived in South Vietnam on 16 December 1966 from Fort Riley, Kansas. On deployment the division was assigned to the III Corps Tactical Zone of Vietnam where it commenced operations in Dinh Tuong and Long An Provinces (6 January-31 May 1967) in Operation Palm Beach. Its area of operations was in the rivers and canals of the Mekong Delta from 1967 to 1972. Operating deep within the Viet Cong (VC)–controlled Delta, the Division was charged with protecting the area and its population against VC insurgents and ensuring the success of the South Vietnamese government's pacification program. Faced with unrelenting physical hardships, a tenacious enemy and the region's rugged terrain, the Division established strategies and quantifiable goals for completing their mission.

Division commanding generals were: Maj. Gen. George S. Eckhardt (February 1966 - June 1967), Maj. Gen. George G. O'Connor (June 1967 - February 1968), Maj. Gen. Julian Ewell (February 1968 - April 1969), Maj. Gen. Harris W. Hollis (April 1969 - August 1969)

The infantry units that served with the 9th Infantry Division were:

2d Battalion, 39th Infantry
3d Battalion, 39th Infantry
4th Battalion, 39th Infantry
2d Battalion, 47th Infantry (Mechanized)
3d Battalion, 47th Infantry (Riverine)
4th Battalion, 47th Infantry (Riverine)
2d Battalion, 60th Infantry
3d Battalion, 60th Infantry (Riverine)
5th Battalion, 60th Infantry (Mechanized Dec. 1966 – 12 September 1968; Infantry 13 September 1968 – October 1970)
6th Battalion, 31st Infantry

Other units included:
 Company E, 50th Infantry (reflagged Co. E, 75th Inf (Ranger)), 2 December 1967 – Aug 1969
 Company E, 75th Infantry, Oct 1969 – Oct 1970
 3d Squadron, 5th Cavalry, Feb 1967 – Nov 1971
 9th Aviation Battalion, Jan 1967 – Aug 1969
 2d Battalion, 4th Artillery (105mm Howitzer), Jan 1967 – Oct 1970
 1st Battalion, 11th Artillery (105mm Howitzer), Jan 1967 – Aug 1969
 3d Battalion, 34th Artillery (105mm Howitzer)(Riverine), Dec 1966 – Jul 1969 (Riverine)
 1st Battalion, 84th Artillery (155mm Howitzer/8-inch Howitzer), Feb 1967 – Aug 1969
 15th Engineer Battalion, Oct 1966 – Aug 1969
 571st Engineer Company, Oct 1969 – Oct 1970
 9th Medical Battalion, 4 January 1967 – 18 August 1969
 9th Signal Battalion, 19 December 1966 – 19 August 1969
 9th Supply and Transport Battalion, 16 December 1966 – 23 August 1969
 709th Maintenance Battalion, 26 January 1967 – 20 August 1969
 9th Adjutant General Company, 30 December 1966 – 26 August 1969
 9th Military Police Company, 19 December 1966 – 25 September 1969
 335th Army Security Agency Company (a.k.a. "335th Radio Research Unit"), 12 January 1967 – 5 April 1971
 99th Support Battalion, 1 October 1969 – 12 October 1970
 493 Military Intelligence Detachment, 3/9th Inf Div, 19 December 1966 - 20 August 1970

One of the experimental units serving with the division was the 39th Cavalry Platoon (Air Cushion Vehicle) which used three of the specially designed hovercraft to patrol marshy terrain like the Plain of Reeds along the south Vietnamese/Cambodian border. Other experimental units were the 1st and 2nd Airboat Platoons, which operated Hurricane Aircat airboats.

From 1967 on, one of the division's brigades (the 2d Brigade) was the Army contingent of the Mobile Riverine Force (MRF). This brigade lived on the ships of Navy Task Force 117, and were transported on their infantry missions throughout the Mekong Delta on Tango boats (converted landing craft) supported by various other armored boats. The MRF was often anchored near the South Vietnamese city of Mỹ Tho, or near the Division's Đồng Tâm Base Camp and they conducted operations in coordination with the Navy SEAL teams, the South Vietnamese Marines, units of the ARVN 7th Division and River Assault Groups. Following the Tet offensive in 1968, General Westmoreland stated that the Division and the MRF saved the Delta region from falling to the People's Army of Vietnam forces. In 1969, the division also operated throughout IV Corps.

Chuck Hagel, former Secretary of Defense, served in the 9th ID from 1967 to 1968. Holding the rank of Sergeant (E-5), he served as an infantry squad leader. Hagel served in the same infantry squad as his younger brother Tom, and they are believed to be the only American siblings to do so during the Vietnam War.

In the 1994 film Forrest Gump, the eponymous main character was a member of the 9th Infantry Division in Vietnam, notably: 4th Platoon, Company A, 2nd Battalion, 47th Infantry.

The Division's major units departed South Vietnam on 27 August 1969 (HHC & 1st Brigade) to Hawaii; 27 August 1969 (2nd Brigade) to Fort Lewis, Washington; 12 October 1970 (3rd Brigade) to Fort Lewis.

Post Vietnam

9th Infantry Division 
Following the Vietnam War the division was stationed at Fort Lewis in Washington. The formal activation ceremony was held on 26 May 1972. Initially the division was organized under the army's Reorganization Objective Army Division system.

Parts of the division between 1972 - 1983 were organized as follows:
 9th Cavalry Brigade (Air Attack) (activated 18 December 1980)
 3rd Squadron, 5th Cavalry
 9th Aviation Battalion (activated 21 April 1972)
 268th Attack Helicopter Battalion (activated 1 September 1981)
 Company A, 214th Aviation Battalion (activated 1 July 1981)
 Division Artillery (activated 21 June 1972)
 2nd Battalion, 4th Field Artillery (activated 21 October 1972)
 1st Battalion, 11th Field Artillery (activated 21 July 1972)
 3rd Battalion, 34th Field Artillery (activated 21 October 1972)
 1st Battalion, 84th Field Artillery (activated 21 October 1972)
 Battery E, 333rd Field Artillery (activated 21 November 1977)
 Division Support Command
 Division Material Management Center
 9th Medical Battalion
 9th Supply & Transportation Battalion
 709th Maintenance Battalion
 9th Adjutant General Company
 9th Finance Company
 9th Division Band
 100th Ordnance Detachment
 1st Battalion, 67th Air Defense Artillery (activated 13 September 1972 - 1 April 1979)
 1st Battalion, 4th Air Defense Artillery (activated 1 April 1979)
 9th Signal Battalion (activated 21 June 1972)
 15th Engineer Battalion (activated 21 June 1972)
 109th Military Intelligence Battalion (activated 1 October 1981)
 Company A (former 335th Army Security Agency Company (activated 21 December 1977 - reorganized 1 October 1981)
 Company B (former 9th Military Intelligence Company (activated 21 December 1972 - reorganized 1 October 1981)
 9th Chemical Company (activated 1 September 1981)
 9th Military Police Company

9th Infantry Division (Motorized) 

From 1983 the division served as the High-Technology Test-Bed (HTTB) for the army. This led to the division to develop the concept of "motorized infantry" from 1983 onward. The motorized infantry division was to be equipped with enhanced technology to give it deployability and fire power and fill the gap between light and heavy divisions. The idea was to create a lighter version of the armored and mechanized divisions, which could be deployed easily by aircraft, while providing more firepower than a light infantry division.

Initially the vision was to create three motorized brigades with three new types of infantry battalion:
 Light Attack Battalion
 Combined Arms Battalion Light
 Combined Arms Battalion Heavy

The light attack battalions utilized the Fast Attack Vehicles (FAV - later re-designated the Desert Patrol Vehicle). Essentially a Volkswagen-engined dune buggy mounted with either a 40mm Mk 19 grenade launcher or .50 caliber M2 Browning machine gun. The FAV was designed to provide highly mobile firepower that could attack the flanks of heavier mechanized units. Some variants also mounted TOW missiles. All of these weapons systems were attached to the FAV by a mount designed to break away if the vehicle rolled over, which they were prone to do. The FAVs were problematic at best and were eventually replaced by various versions of the Humvee/HMMWV light truck.

The combined arms battalions were organized as a mix of assault gun companies and light motorized infantry companies, with the heavy battalions fielding two assault gun companies and one light motorized infantry company, while the ratio was reversed in the light battalions. The assault gun companies were to be equipped with the Armored Gun System (AGS), but because of delays in the AGS program they were initially equipped with M901 ITVs Improved Tow Vehicles, then M551 Sheridan light tanks and later with Humvees with TOW missiles or Mk 19 grenade launchers. Light motorized infantry companies were equipped with Humvees mounting a Mk 19 grenade launcher. Each combined arms battalion also fielded a combat support company equipped with mortars, scouts, and an anti-armor platoon slated to be equipped with Humvees mounting a ground version of the Hellfire missile. As this Hellfire version never entered service, the platoons were later also equipped with Humvees with TOW missiles.

The division's first and third brigade were to field one of each of the three new battalions, while the second brigade would field three combined arms battalions heavy. The third brigade was to field one light and one heavy combined arms battalion and the 9th Cavalry Brigade two attack helicopter battalions, one combat support aviation battalion, and one cavalry reconnaissance squadron. The division artillery would consist of three battalions equipped with M198 155mm towed howitzers, one light artillery rocket battalion with M102 105mm towed howitzers and M270 Multiple Launch Rocket Systems, and one target acquisition battery. The division support command would field three forward support, one cavalry support and one main support battalion. However, because of the delay of the Armored Gun System the division did only activate four of the envisioned five combined arms battalions heavy and retained the 2nd Battalion, 77th Armor instead.

Parts of the division were organized at the end of the 1980s as follows:
 9th Cavalry Brigade (Air Attack)
 3rd Squadron, 5th Cavalry
 9th Aviation Battalion
 268th Attack Helicopter Battalion
 Company A, 214th Aviation Battalion
 Division Artillery
 2nd Battalion, 4th Field Artillery
 1st Battalion, 11th Field Artillery
 3rd Battalion, 34th Field Artillery
 1st Battalion, 84th Field Artillery
 Battery E, 333rd Field Artillery
 Division Support Command
 1st Support Battalion (Forward)
 2nd Support Battalion (Forward)
 3rd Support Battalion (Forward)
 4th Support Battalion (Aviation)
 5th Support Battalion (Main)
 1st Battalion, 4th Air Defense Artillery
 9th Signal Battalion
 15th Engineer Battalion
 109th Military Intelligence Battalion
 9th Chemical Company
 9th Military Police Company
 9th Division Band

In case of war with the Warsaw Pact the division's would have reinforced the Allied Forces Baltic Approaches Command defending Denmark. By 1984 the 9th Cavalry Brigade (Air Attack) was testing motorcycles for reconnaissance work in its reconnaissance squadron, the 3rd Squadron, 5th Cavalry Regiment. And the 9th Infantry Division (MTZ) tested motorized infantry doctrine at the Yakima Firing Center in Eastern Washington, at the National Training Center at Fort Irwin California and in Korea during the annual Team Spirit exercise. While the motorized units performed well they were vulnerable to heavier mechanized forces, particularly if forced to stand and fight. They were also extremely vulnerable to indirect (artillery) fires.

On 1 April 1984, Echo Company of the 15th Engineer Battalion reorganized to form the 73rd Engineer Company (Assault Ribbon Bridge), which was assigned to I Corps, which in turn attached it as separate company to the 15th Engineer Battalion. With the switch from Combat Arms Regimental System to the United States Army Regimental System the division saw a few of its units reflagged or inactivated:

 15 September 1986: Company A, 214th Aviation Battalion inactivated
 2 October 1986: 2nd Battalion, 4th Field Artillery to 3rd Battalion, 11th Field Artillery
 2 October 1986: 3rd Battalion, 34th Field Artillery to 6th Battalion, 11th Field Artillery
 16 March 1987: 3rd Squadron, 5th Cavalry to 1st Squadron, 9th Cavalry
 16 April 1987: 2nd Battalion, 77th Armor to 1st Battalion, 33rd Armor
 1987: 9th Aviation Battalion to 1st Battalion, 9th Aviation
 1987: 268th Attack Helicopter Battalion to 2nd Battalion, 9th Aviation
 16 March 1988: 1st Battalion, 4th Air Defense Artillery to 1st Battalion, 44th Air Defense Artillery
 unknown date:
 1st Support Battalion (Forward) to 99th Support Battalion
 2nd Support Battalion (Forward) to 109th Support Battalion
 3rd Support Battalion (Forward) to 209th Support Battalion
 4th Support Battalion (Aviation) to 3rd Battalion, 9th Aviation
 5th Support Battalion (Main) to 709th Support Battalion (Main)

During fiscal year 1987 the army decided to inactivate the division's 2nd brigade, which would be replaced by the 81st Infantry Brigade (Mechanized) of the Washington Army National Guard. The 2nd brigade was inactivated on 15 August 1988 along with the following units:

 2nd Combined Arms Battalion Heavy, 47th Infantry
 3rd Combined Arms Battalion Heavy, 60th Infantry
 6th Battalion, 11th Field Artillery (inactivated 15 September 1988)
 209th Support Battalion

On the same date the 1st Battalion, 33rd Armor, which until then had been attached to the division, was assigned to the division. With the inactivation of the 2nd brigade the remaining units were reassigned among the remaining brigades: 1st brigade now consisted of 2nd Combined Arms Battalion Heavy, 2nd Infantry, 1st Battalion, 33rd Armor, and 4th Combined Arms Battalion Light, 23rd Infantry. 3rd brigade consisted of 2nd Light Attack Battalion, 1st Infantry, 3rd Combined Arms Battalion Light, 47th Infantry, and 2nd Combined Arms Battalion Heavy, 60th Infantry. The 2nd Combined Arms Battalion Heavy, 23rd Infantry was assigned to the 9th Cavalry Brigade.

Organization 1988 
McGrath writes that the 9th Infantry Division was organized as follows in 1988:

 9th Infantry Division (Motorized), Fort Lewis, WA
 Headquarters & Headquarters Company
 1st Brigade
 Headquarters & Headquarters Company
 1st Battalion, 33rd Armor
 2nd Combined Arms Battalion Heavy, 2nd Infantry
 4th Combined Arms Battalion Light, 23rd Infantry
 3rd Brigade
 Headquarters & Headquarters Company
 2nd Light Attack Battalion, 1st Infantry
 3rd Combined Arms Battalion Light, 47th Infantry
 2nd Combined Arms Battalion Heavy, 60th Infantry
 81st Infantry Brigade (Mechanized), (Washington Army National Guard), Seattle, WA
 Headquarters & Headquarters Company
 1st Battalion, 303rd Armor
 1st Battalion, 803rd Armor
 1st Battalion, 161st Infantry (Mechanized)
 3rd Battalion, 161st Infantry (Mechanized)
 2nd Battalion, 146th Field Artillery (M109 155mm self-propelled howitzers)
 181st Support Battalion
 Troop E, 303rd Cavalry
 898th Engineer Company
 Battery D, 216th Air Defense Artillery (Minnesota Army National Guard) - did not exist after 1993
 9th Cavalry Brigade (Air Combat)
 Headquarters & Headquarters Troop
 1st Squadron, 9th Cavalry (8 × AH-1F Cobra, 12 × OH-58C Kiowa, 2 × UH-60A Black Hawk)
 2nd Battalion, 9th Aviation (30 × UH-60A Black Hawk & 16 × CH-47D Chinook)
 1st Battalion, 9th Aviation (21 × AH-1F Cobra & 13 × OH-58C Kiowa, a second attack helicopter battalion was scheduled to be activated)
 2nd Combined Arms Battalion Heavy, 47th Infantry
 Division Artillery
 Headquarters & Headquarters Battery
 1st Battalion, 11th Field Artillery (18 × M198 155mm towed howitzers)
 3rd Battalion, 11th Field Artillery (18 × M198 155mm towed howitzer)
 1st Battalion, 84th Field Artillery (12 × M102 105mm towed howitzer & 9 × M270 Multiple Launch Rocket Systems)
 Battery E, 333rd Field Artillery (Target Acquisition, AN/TPQ-36 Firefinder & AN/TPQ-37 Firefinder radars)
 Division Support Command
 3rd Battalion, 9th Aviation
 99th Support Battalion (Forward) (supports 3rd Brigade)
 109th Support Battalion (Forward) (supports 1st Brigade)
 709th Support Battalion (Main)
 1st Battalion, 44th Air Defense Artillery
 15th Engineer Battalion
 9th Signal Battalion
 109th Military Intelligence Battalion
 9th Chemical Company
 9th Military Police Company
 73rd Engineer Company (Assault Ribbon Bridge)
 9th Division Band

In fiscal year 1989 Chief of Staff of the United States Army General Carl E. Vuono approved the conversion of the division's two combined arms battalions light to standard mechanized infantry battalions.

Inactivation 
The division was the first to undergo full inactivation following the end of the Cold War. Army leadership at first decided that inactivating units would turn in all of their equipment at "10/20" standard – in ready and reusable condition. The division struggled to meet this standard. It required both extensive work on the part of the division's soldiers and high costs in repair parts. While the remaining 9th ID soldiers were ultimately successful, later inactivating units were not required to attain this goal.

The inactivation of the division began on 28 September 1990 with the inactivation of the 1st Brigade, 2nd Battalion, 23rd Infantry, and 4th Battalion, 23rd Infantry. The 1st Battalion, 84th Field Artillery inactivated on 15 January 1991.  As inactivation proceeded, elements and individual Soldiers from the division were detached and deployed for service in the Gulf War.

On 16 February 1991 the 3rd Brigade was reflagged as 199th Infantry Brigade (Motorized) with the following units:

 199th Infantry Brigade (Motorized), Fort Lewis
 Headquarters & Headquarters Company
 1st Battalion, 33rd Armor
 2nd Battalion, 1st Infantry
 3rd Battalion, 47th Infantry
 1st Battalion, 11th Field Artillery
 99th Support Battalion (Forward)
 Troop A, 9th Cavalry (rest of 1st Squadron, 9th Cavalry disbanded on the same date)
 102nd Engineer Company (Company D, 15th Engineer Battalion)
 9th Chemical Company
 Battery E, 44th Air Defense Artillery (rest of 1st Battalion, 44th Air Defense Artillery disbanded on the same date)

The remainder of the division's units inactivated on the following dates:

 15 February 1991: 2nd Battalion, 60th Infantry
 15 April 1991: 15th Engineer Battalion
 15 May 1991: 2nd Battalion, 2nd Infantry
 15 July 1991: 9th Signal Battalion and Battery E, 333rd Field Artillery
 15 September 1991: 109th Military Intelligence Battalion

With the support and aviation units inactivating in the same timeframe. The divisional headquarters remained active until 15 December 1991. The 3rd Battalion, 11th Field Artillery became a General Support battalion of I Corps Artillery.

Though it was inactivated, the division was identified as the second highest priority inactive division in the United States Army Center of Military History's lineage scheme due to its numerous accolades and long history. All of the division's flags and heraldic items were moved to the National Infantry Museum at Fort Benning, Georgia following its inactivation. Should the U.S. Army decide to activate more divisions in the future, the center stated its activation recommendations would be the 9th Infantry Division, then the 24th Infantry Division, the 5th Infantry Division, and the 2nd Armored Division. The 7th Infantry Division, previously inactivated, resumed service as an administrative headquarters at Joint Base Lewis–McChord in 2012.

See also 
Lewis Army Museum

References

Bibliography
 - Public Domain - United States Government

Further reading
 Thomas H. Harvey Jr., "9th CBAA: Mission First,", U.S. Army Aviation Digest, December 1981, 40–45. Included 214th and 268th Attack Helicopter Battalions, 9th Avn Bn (Combat Support), 3rd Sqn, 5th Cavalry, and a Headquarters and Headquarters Troop.
The Army Almanac: A Book of Facts Concerning the Army of the United States U.S. Government Printing Office, 1950 reproduced at CMH

External links 

9th Infantry Division Association
The 9th Infantry Division during World War II - Official History & Research
Historical researches about the 9th Infantry Division during World War II, and the Lieutenant Cook Museum
The 9th Division WWII Historical Preservation Society
9th INFANTRY DIVISION World War II Order of Battle
39th Infantry Regiment
47th Infantry Regiment Tribute, 9th Infantry Division in World War II
60th Infantry Regiment
Hitler's Nemesis: The 9th Infantry Division (World War II Stars and Stripes booklet)
9th Infantry Division, Normandy American Cemetery
9th Infantry Division Reenacted-California
Fort Lewis: 9th Infantry Division
Operation Keystone Robin, 3rd Brigade, 9th Infantry Division, Redeployment to CONUS  Vietnam War After Action Report

Infantry divisions of the United States Army
Infantry Division, U.S. 009th
009th Infantry Division
Infantry divisions of the United States Army in World War II
Military units and formations established in 1918
Military units and formations disestablished in 1991
United States Army divisions of World War I